Percy Rodriguez was an actor.

Percy ROdriguez may also refer to:

Percy Rodriguez (footballer)
Percy Rodríguez, politician